{{DISPLAYTITLE:C14H10Cl4}}
The molecular formula C14H10Cl4 (molar mass: 320.04 g/mol) may refer to:

 Dichlorodiphenyldichloroethane (DDD), an organochloride insecticide
 Mitotane, an antineoplastic medication

Molecular formulas